Abippus (also known as Abibus and Habib) is a saint of the Greek Orthodox Church. His feast day is 26 March.

References

Sources
Holweck, F. G. A Biographical Dictionary of the Saints. St. Louis, MO: B. Herder Book Co. 1924.

Year of birth missing
Year of death missing
Eastern Orthodox saints
Christian saints in unknown century